Biren Roy (1910-1993) was an Indian politician. He was a Member of Parliament, representing West Bengal in the Rajya Sabha, the upper house of India's Parliament representing the Indian National Congress.

References

External links
Official biographical sketch in Parliament of India website

Rajya Sabha members from West Bengal
Indian National Congress politicians
1910 births
1993 deaths